The 1991 North Norfolk District Council election took place on 2 May 1991 to elect members of North Norfolk District Council in England. This was on the same day as other local elections.

Election result

|}

References

1991 English local elections
May 1991 events in the United Kingdom
1991
1990s in Norfolk